By-elections for Prague 4 and Znojmo District Senate seats were held in the Czech Republic in October 2004. Elections were held after incumbent senators became members of European parliament.

Prague 4 

Election in Prague 4 was won by František Příhoda who defeated Erazim Kohák by landslide. Příhoda's victory was generally expected.

Znojmo

Znojmo election was unexpectedly won by Milan Špaček. He faced Jaroslav Pařík who was considered front-runner due to his results in the first round.

References

Senate by-elections
Senate by-elections
2004
Senate district 20 – Prague 4
Senate district 54 – Znojmo
Elections in Prague